Catocyclotis  is a genus in the butterfly family Riodinidae present only in the Neotropical realm.

Species 
Catocyclotis aemulius (Fabricius, 1793)
Catocyclotis adelina (Butler, 1872)
Catocyclotis elpinice (Godman, 1903)

References

Nymphidiini
Butterfly genera
Taxa named by Hans Ferdinand Emil Julius Stichel